Brush Creek is an unincorporated community in Sequatchie County, Tennessee, United States.

Notes

Unincorporated communities in Sequatchie County, Tennessee
Unincorporated communities in Tennessee